Alexander Barantschik (born 1953) joined the San Francisco Symphony as Concertmaster in September 2001, having served as Concertmaster of the London Symphony Orchestra and Netherlands Radio Philharmonic.

Born in St. Petersburg, after training at the Saint Petersburg Conservatory, he performed with various Soviet orchestras, including the St Petersburg Philharmonic, before emigrating in 1979 to become concertmaster of the Bamberg Symphony Orchestra. He was concertmaster of the Netherlands Radio Philharmonic from 1982–2001 and leader of the London Symphony Orchestra from 1989-2001. He moved to the United States in 2001 at the request of San Francisco Symphony music director Michael Tilson Thomas.

Barantschik has won various competitions, including the International Violin Competition in Sion, Switzerland, and the Russian National Violin Competition. As a chamber musician, he has performed with Mstislav Rostropovich, Maxim Vengerov, and Yuri Bashmet.

He performs on the c.1742 Guarnerius del Gesù violin that was once owned by Ferdinand David, and Jascha Heifetz. Barantschik has used the instrument in performances with the San Francisco Symphony and the San Francisco Academy Orchestra.

External links
 Profile and interview from San Francisco Chronicle
 The San Francisco Academy Orchestra Press Room
 San Francisco Symphony - Members of the Orchestra

Russian violinists
Male classical violinists
Concertmasters
Living people
1953 births
21st-century classical violinists
21st-century Russian male musicians